Pavel Petříkov (born 20 June 1986 in Hořice) is a Czech judoka. He competed at the 2016 Summer Olympics in the men's 60 kg event, in which he was eliminated in the third round by Naohisa Takato.

He is the son of Czech judoka Pavel Petřikov Sr.

Achievements

References

External links
 
 

1986 births
Living people
Czech male judoka
Judoka at the 2008 Summer Olympics
Judoka at the 2016 Summer Olympics
Olympic judoka of the Czech Republic
Judoka at the 2015 European Games
European Games competitors for the Czech Republic
Universiade medalists in judo
People from Hořice
Universiade bronze medalists for the Czech Republic
Judoka at the 2019 European Games
Sportspeople from the Hradec Králové Region